Capu or CAPU may refer to:

 Capu River, Romania
 Capilano University, North Vancouver, Canada
 Central de Autobuses Puebla, Puebla, Mexico

See also 
 
 Kapu (disambiguation)